Daliel's Gallery (stylized in all lowercase, and sometimes just 'daliel') was a display and performance space in the San Francisco Bay Area in California in the 1940s and 1950s; the building also contained Daliel's Bookstore. George Leite opened Daliel's at 2466 Telegraph Avenue between Dwight and Haste Streets in Berkeley, as a combination bookstore and art gallery in 1945, naming both after a half-brother in Portugal he had never met, Dalael Leite.

The bookstore was also the home of Circle Magazine and Circle Editions, the publishing ventures Leite established at the same time. 

Artists featured in the gallery included painters, sculptors and printmakers, as well as jewellers, musicians, and modern dancers. These included painter Zahara Schatz, jazz musician Dave Brubeck from Concord, sculptor Jean Varda, and jeweler Peter Macchiarini.  One show in 1950 was by a group of nuns from Oregon who had been taught in a summer class at their college by Jean Varda. The store closed in 1952 several years after the magazine ceased publication.

Partial list of Artists Exhibited 
 Chiura Obata – water colors
 Dave Brubeck – jazz chamber music
 David Park (painter) – paintings
 Elmer Bischoff – paintings
 Eugene Berman Berman Brothers – paintings
 George Albert Harris – paintings
 Jean Varda – mosaics and collages
 Man Ray – photographs
 Marc Chagall – prints
 Peter Macchiarini – jewelry
 Robert P. McChesney – drawings and paintings
 Zahara Schatz – plastic laminations and paintings

References 

1945 establishments in California
1952 disestablishments in California
Beat Generation
Bookstores in the San Francisco Bay Area
Companies based in Berkeley, California
Culture of Berkeley, California
Defunct art museums and galleries in California
Defunct companies based in the San Francisco Bay Area
Retail companies based in California
Independent bookstores of the United States